The 1973–74 Alpha Ethniki was the 38th season of the highest football league of Greece. The season began on 23 September 1973 and ended on 22 June 1974. Olympiacos won their second consecutive and 19th Greek title. That was the last season in which Cypriot teams took part, while this season a new point system was introduced (Win: 2 points - Draw: 1 point - Loss: 0 points), replacing the corresponding 3–2–1.

League table

Results

Top scorers

External links
Greek Wikipedia
Official Greek FA Site
Greek SuperLeague official Site
SuperLeague Statistics

Alpha Ethniki seasons
Greece
1973–74 in Greek football leagues